René Lotti (17 April 1929 – 29 December 2020) was a French rower. He competed in the men's coxed four event at the 1948 Summer Olympics.

References

External links
 

1929 births
2020 deaths
French male rowers
Olympic rowers of France
Rowers at the 1948 Summer Olympics
Sportspeople from Val-de-Marne